Thomas Mor Alexandrios, formerly Thomas Abraham Neriyanthara, is the Metropolitan of Mumbai Diocese of Malankara Jacobite Syriac Orthodox Church.

Biography 

Thomas Abraham Neriyanthara was born in Panampady, Kottayam, Kerala in 1971 as son of Fr. N. M. Abraham and Mrs. Elizabeth Abraham. He was baptized at St. Mary's Jacobite Syrian Orthodox Church Panampady, Kottayam his home parish.

Theological studies 
After his graduation, he joined the Presbyterian Theological Seminary, Dehradun for his Theological studies. He completed his B.Th. (Bachelor of Theology)
Post which he completed Master of Divinity from Beracah Bible College & Seminary, Thiruvallur.
He also holds a diploma in Philosophy from Mor Aphrem Seminary, Vadavathoor, Kottayam, Kerala

Ordination 
Thomas Abraham Neriyanthara was ordained as a deacon on 15 March 1997, by Joseph Mor Gregorios and as a priest on 15 May 2004, by Thomas Mor Themotheos. After his ordination as priest he served as vicar in St. Peter's J.S.O Church, Chicago, USA and St. Mary's JSO Church, Vellore, Tamil Nadu. He was elevated to the position of Metropolitan (Bishop) as Thomas Mor Alexandrios on 2 January 2012 at the Puthencuriz St. Athanasious Cathedral by Baselios Thomas I.

Other positions 
He is the founder and director of Santhwana Guidance & Counselling Centre at Vellore, Tamil Nadu. The centre was consecrated by Baselios Thomas I on 24 March 2012.

The synod of the Jacobite Church made him metropolitan of their Mumbai diocese on 13 June 2013.

References 

1971 births
Living people
Syriac Orthodox Church bishops
Indian Oriental Orthodox Christians
Christian clergy from Kottayam